Aleksey Aleksandrovich Aksyonov (born 10 December 1987) is a Russian sprint athlete.

Achievements

References
 

1987 births
Living people
Russian male sprinters
European Athletics Championships medalists